The 1958 PGA Championship was the 40th PGA Championship, played July 17–20 at Llanerch Country Club in Havertown, Pennsylvania, a suburb west of Philadelphia. It was the first PGA Championship held in its current stroke play format, 72 holes over four days, ending on Sunday. The previous editions were at match play, with the two most recent ones at seven rounds over five days, the final two rounds at 36 holes per match. The announcement of the change was made eight months earlier in November.

Dow Finsterwald, the runner-up in 1957, shot a final round 67 to win his only major title, two shots ahead of runner-up Billy Casper. Finsterwald's round-by-round scores were 67-72-70-67=276, 4-under-par on the par-70 course. Sam Snead led after 54 holes in pursuit of a fourth title, but faded to third with a final round 73 (+3). The winner's share was $5,500, down from the previous year's $8,000.

The Open Championship was held two weeks earlier in England at Royal Lytham & St Annes, with only two Americans in the field; Gene Sarazen finished 16th, but missed the first cut at the PGA Championship.

Round summaries
Thursday, July 17, 1958

Source:

Second round
Friday, July 18, 1958

Source:

Third round
Saturday, July 19, 1958

Source:

Final round
Sunday, July 20, 1958

Source:

References

External links
PGA Media Guide 2012
PGA.com – 1958 PGA Championship

PGA Championship
Golf in Pennsylvania
PGA Championship
PGA Championship
PGA Championship
PGA Championship